Bozgüney is a village in the Lachin District of Azerbaijan.

References 

Villages in Azerbaijan
Populated places in Lachin District